Robert Coran Capshaw is an American music industry executive and entrepreneur.  He is the manager of Dave Matthews Band, Phish, Lady A, Trey Anastasio and Chris Stapleton among others.  Capshaw founded Red Light Management and co-founded ATO Records. He is also a real estate developer.

Biography
Capshaw got his start as a music manager in the early 1990s when he was the owner of a bar in Charlottesville, VA called "Trax". In 1992, he gave the Dave Matthews Band their first weekly gig (which lasted from 1992 to 1993). From there, he began managing Dave Matthews Band and helped launch their career, bringing them from local bar band to international fame.

Capshaw has won the Pollstar Magazine's "Manager of the Year" award five times in 1998, 2003, 2010, 2018 and 2019.  He has been nominated for the award eighteen times.In 2017, Capshaw was the recipient of the City of Hope Spirit of Life Award.

In 2011, Capshaw became the first artist manager to receive Billboard's Humanitarian Award in recognition of his commitment to local, national, and international community efforts and philanthropy. Capshaw was also named "International Manager of The Year" by the Music Managers Forum Roll of Honour in 2007.

Business developments

In 2005, The Charlottesville Pavilion, a $3.5 million joint endeavor between the city of Charlottesville and Capshaw opened on the downtown mall.  The pavilion serves multiple uses in the community including hosting the Fridays After Five free concert series.  Since opening the Pavilion has been renamed the Sprint Pavilion.  The Pavilion has hosted concerts by Earth Wind and Fire, Dave Matthews & Tim Reynolds, Chris Stapleton, Alabama Shakes, Beck, Jack White, Alanis Morissette, The Smashing Pumpkins, Snoop Dogg, Loretta Lynn, Arcade Fire, The Avett Brothers, and Trey Anastasio among others. In addition to concerts, the Pavilion has hosted appearances by Barack Obama, the Dalai Lama, and Bruce Springsteen.

Jefferson Theater

Capshaw owns the historic Jefferson Theater in downtown Charlottesville, and oversaw an intensive renovation beginning in 2006.  The Jefferson Theater reopened on November 27, 2009 after a comprehensive restoration that highlights the theater's vintage architecture while modernizing its facilities. The Jefferson Theater was established in 1912 as a live performance theater that played host to silent movies, vaudeville acts and a historic list of live performers, ranging from Harry Houdini to The Three Stooges.

Real Estate

Capshaw has been heavily involved in real estate development in the Charlottesville area including the addition of the Charlottesville Pavilion and the ongoing plans to add a nine-story building near the Downtown Mall. Capshaw also owns restaurants on the Downtown Mall such as Ten. He is a graduate of the University of Virginia.

Starr Hill Presents

Capshaw also founded sister company Starr Hill Presents to promote live music on a regional and national level. The company has an equity position in large-scale music festivals including the Bonnaroo Music and Arts Festival, Outside Lands, Lollapalooza, Austin City Limits and Wanderlust Festival. In 2012, Starr Hill announced a partnership with the Southern Café & Music Hall, a venue on South First Street in Charlottesville.

References

External links
 Coran Capshaw, Business Genius

Businesspeople from Charlottesville, Virginia
Living people
Year of birth missing (living people)
American music people
Dave Matthews Band